Ivan Blaće (born 1 July 1984) is a Croatian former professional basketball player.

Personal life 
He was born in Šibenik in July 1984. In 2017, he married Croatian model Maja Spahija.

References

External links
Ivan Blaće at realgm.com

1984 births
Living people
Croatian men's basketball players
GKK Šibenik players
Basketball players from Šibenik
Forwards (basketball)